Novoroscement is a major producer of cement with its headquarters located in Novorossiysk, Russia. The company's full name is Открытое акционерное общество Новоросцемент (Joint Stock Company Novoroscement).

History
The company originated in 1882 when the first cement factory in Novorossiysk was launched, named the Black Sea Society Cement Production (now called The Proletariat).

In 1922, the Novoroscement trust was established as part of the restoration of factories that were destroyed during the Russian Civil War. In 1992, the Novoroscement plant was privatised.

Owners and executives
The owner of all the company's shares is the Cyprus offshore company Chevra Investments Limited. The ultimate beneficiary of this company is a Russian businessman, Lev Kvetnoy.

Activity
The company owns three cement plants in the Krasnodar Territory – The Proletariat, October and Pervomajskij. These plants produce cement from high quality local raw materials, especially marl.

Cement production in 2009 amounted to 3.8 million tons of cement (in 2008 — 4.0 million tons). The company's revenue for 2009 amounted to 7.69 billion rubles. (for 2008 — 14.1 billion rubles), net profit -— 1.29 billion rubles. (6.29 billion rubles). Cement production in 2007 totalled 3.8 million tons, with total revenue of US$400 million and net profit of US$215 million, as reported according to IFRS standards.

References

External links
 Company website

Building materials companies of Russia
Companies based in Novorossiysk
Manufacturing companies established in 1922
Russian brands
1922 establishments in Russia
Manufacturing companies of the Soviet Union